Morton School is a historic school building located at West Lafayette, Tippecanoe County, Indiana. It was built in 1930, and is a two-story, "E"-shaped, Tudor Revival style brick and limestone building.  It has a flat roof and features a triple-arched main entrance and stepped parapet.  It housed a school into the mid-1980s, after which it has been used as a community centre.

It was listed on the National Register of Historic Places in 1999.

References

West Lafayette, Indiana
School buildings on the National Register of Historic Places in Indiana
Tudor Revival architecture in Indiana
School buildings completed in 1930
Schools in Tippecanoe County, Indiana
National Register of Historic Places in Tippecanoe County, Indiana
1930 establishments in Indiana